ILAN is an Israeli umbrella organization for the treatment of disabled children. Precursor to the organization were the 1950s ILANSHIL organization and the "penny march" and started by Betty Dubiner to help polio victims. ILAN was founded in 1963, and expanded its scope to all disabled children.

References

Children's charities based in Israel
Disability organizations based in Israel
1963 establishments in Israel